Pouni is a town in the Centre-Ouest Region of Burkina Faso.

Populated places in the Centre-Ouest Region
Sanguié Province